David Medlock Jr. (1824 – ?) served in the Texas legislature during the Reconstruction era. He was born in Georgia to an enslaved family that was relocated to Texas. After emancipation he settled in Limestone County, Texas with family members. 

He served in the Texas House of Representatives during the Twelfth Texas Legislature from February 8, 1870 to December 2, 1871. He was a representstive until January 14, 1873. He was on the Federal Relations Committee, sponsored a bill  incorporating Springfield, Texas, and sought funding for construction of a jail in Limestone County.

He married in 1848 and had 9 children. After his wife died he married her sister and had 3 more children. 

The Bullock Museum has his oath of office marked with an X for his signature.

See also
African-American officeholders during and following the Reconstruction era

References

Members of the Texas House of Representatives

1824 births
Date of death unknown